The 2007 All-Ireland Minor Hurling Championship was the 77th staging of the All-Ireland Minor Hurling Championship since its establishment by the Gaelic Athletic Association in 1928. The championship began on 21 April 2007 and ended on 2 September 2007.

Tipperary entered the championship as the defending champions.

On 2 September 2007, Tipperary won the championship following a 3-14 to 2-11 defeat of Cork in the All-Ireland final. This was their second All-Ireland title in-a-row.

Cork's Ryan Clifford was the championship's top scorer with 5-30.

Results

Leinster Minor Hurling Championship

First round

Second round

Quarter-finals

Semi-finals

Final

Munster Minor Hurling Championship

Quarter-finals

Play-off

Semi-finals

Final

Ulster Minor Hurling Championship

Semi-final

Final

All-Ireland Minor Hurling Championship

Quarter-finals

Semi-finals

Final

Championship statistics

Top scorers

Top scorers overall

Top scorers in a single game

References

Minor
All-Ireland Minor Hurling Championship